The Inambari woodcreeper (Lepidocolaptes fatimalimae) is a species of bird in the subfamily Dendrocolaptinae.  It is found in western Amazonia.  Its natural habitat is subtropical or tropical moist lowland forests.

References

 

Inambari woodcreeper
Birds of the Amazon Basin
Birds of the Peruvian Amazon
Birds of the Bolivian Amazon
Inambari woodcreeper
Inambari woodcreeper